Chain Link is a 2008 American drama film directed by Dylan Reynolds, starring Mark Irvingsen, Jim Storm, Yassmin Alers, Luciano Rauso and Jody Jaress.

Cast
 Mark Irvingsen as Anthony
 Jim Storm as Duncan
 Yassmin Alers as Jade
 Luciano Rauso as "Little Man"
 Jody Jaress as Rhea
 Peter Looney as Cromwell
 David Kallaway as Brian
 Lelia Goldoni as Floraine
 Jim Round as Officer O'Keefe

Reception
Kristi Matsuda of LA Weekly wrote that while the script "sometimes slips into sentimentality and entertains the odd delusion of grandeur", the film "mostly presents a spare, refreshingly clear-eyed depiction of a deadbeat’s downward spiral."

Mark Keizer of Boxoffice Pro rated the film 3 stars out of 5 and wrote that while Reynolds "adds little to the conversation", his "close-to-the-bone rendering still draws you in, proving once again that movies begin and end with characters you care about."

Brad Wilke of Film Threat wrote that while the film "does a pretty good job of telling its story", it is "a shame that we’ve seen it all before."

Gary Goldstein of the Los Angeles Times wrote that while Reynolds "deserves credit for his confident, singular approach", his emphasis on "“performance over perfection in image” nets mixed results."

Robert Koehler of Variety wrote that the film "struggles to make a downhill life seem something more than just inevitable."

References

External links
 
 

American drama films
2008 drama films
2008 films